Bernd Ahrendt is a German rower who competed for the SC Dynamo Berlin / Sportvereinigung (SV) Dynamo. He won medals at international competitions.

References

External links
 

Year of birth missing (living people)
Living people
East German male rowers
World Rowing Championships medalists for East Germany
European Rowing Championships medalists